Prasophyllum dossenum is a species of orchid endemic to a small area of northern New South Wales. It has a single tubular, dark green leaf and up to thirty scented pinkish-white and greenish-brown flowers crowded along an erect flowering stem. It is a  rare orchid which grows in grassy places on the Northern Tablelands of New South Wales.

Description
The flowers are scented, pinkish-white and greenish-brown. As with others in the genus, the flowers are inverted so that the labellum is above the column rather than below it. The edge of the labellum flares widely and is wavy near its tip. There is a fleshy, yellowish-green, channelled callus in the centre of the labellum. Flowering occurs from November to January and the flowers remain open for up to two weeks.

Taxonomy and naming
Prasophyllum dossenum was first formally described in 1991 by David Jones from a specimen collected near Guyra and the description was published in Australian Orchid Research. The specific epithet (dossenum) is a Latin word meaning "hunchback" or "humpback", referring to the swollen lateral sepals.

Distribution and habitat

References

External links 
 

dossenum
Orchids of New South Wales
Endemic orchids of Australia
Plants described in 1991